Pedro Emanuel dos Santos Martins Silva (born 11 February 1975), known as Pedro Emanuel, is a Portuguese retired footballer who played mainly as a central defender, currently manager of Saudi Arabian club Khaleej FC.

In his 16-year professional career he was closely associated with the two biggest teams in Porto, Boavista – he helped it win its first and only Primeira Liga title in 2001 – and FC Porto, being team captain of both. He amassed top-division totals of 268 matches and two goals over 12 seasons, and won 14 major titles between both clubs.

Pedro Emanuel subsequently became a manager, leading three teams in his country's top flight as well as working in Cyprus, Saudi Arabia, Spain and the United Arab Emirates. He won domestic cups with Académica de Coimbra in 2012, Apollon Limassol in 2016 and Al Taawoun in 2019.

Playing career

Club
Pedro Emanuel was born in Luanda, Portuguese Angola. After three seasons as a professional in Portugal's secondary leagues, with F.C. Marco, A.D. Ovarense and F.C. Penafiel, his performances caught the eye of scouts from Porto club Boavista FC, where he had already played as a youth. During his six-year stay in the team he played a large part in the defensive wall – with fellow stopper Litos, fullbacks Nuno Frechaut and Erivan and goalkeeper Ricardo – that led them to the historical Primeira Liga title in 2001; after Litos left for Málaga CF, he captained the team.

Prior to the start of the 2002–03 campaign, S.L. Benfica seemed closer to clinching a deal, but it was FC Porto, under the guidance of José Mourinho, who signed Pedro Emanuel. Part of a strong defense that included Jorge Costa, Ricardo Carvalho, Paulo Ferreira and Nuno Valente, his always effective style earned him the confidence of his manager, and he played in both the UEFA Cup and UEFA Champions League finals won between 2003 and 2004.

In the season following the departure of Mourinho, Pedro Emanuel still managed to appear in the spotlight, as in the 2004 Intercontinental Cup win against Once Caldas, where he scored the decisive penalty, becoming the last player to touch the ball in the competition's history.

In 2005–06, following the decision of Dutch coach Co Adriaanse not wanting a goalkeeper captain (Vítor Baía) and sidelining Costa, Pedro Emanuel was chosen as new captain. He missed the entire following season due to injury, but returned to the starting lineups the following campaign, helping with 19 league appearances as Porto were crowned back-to-back champions.

International
Although Angolan-born, Pedro Emanuel never appeared for its national team. This was viewed as a desire to keep alive the possibility of playing for Portugal, whom he represented as a youth.

Prior to the 2006 FIFA World Cup, Pedro Emanuel accepted a call-up from Angola but FIFA confirmed that he and Carlos Chaínho could not represent other teams than Portugal, because of a new law set-up in 2004 which considered playing for junior sides at international level.

Coaching career

Youth and assistant
After only five matches in 2008–09, in a fourth consecutive league accolade, Pedro Emanuel retired on 16 June 2009. He immediately became Porto's under-17 head coach, guiding them to the national championship after defeating Sporting CP.

In July 2010, Pedro Emanuel returned to Porto's main squad, being named assistant manager to newly appointed André Villas-Boas.

Primeira Liga and Cyprus
In June 2011, Pedro Emanuel had his first head coach experience, being appointed at Académica de Coimbra. In his first season with the Students, Pedro Emanuel narrowly avoided relegation from the top flight. He also led the side to their first Taça de Portugal since 1939, notably defeating former club Porto 3–0 at home in the fourth round and Sporting in the final (1–0).

Pedro Emanuel took over at recently promoted F.C. Arouca on 6 June 2013. After helping evade top-tier relegation by five points, he left the club on 25 May 2015.

On 10 June 2015, Pedro Emanuel moved abroad for the first time in his career, taking over at Apollon Limassol of the Cypriot First Division; his team already included three compatriots. He won the cup and supercup in his first season, but was sacked on 11 December 2016.

Pedro Emanuel went back to his country and signed as manager of G.D. Estoril Praia on 8 March 2017. On 21 October of that year, as the side ranked last in the league and had already been ousted from the domestic cup by lowly S.C. Farense, he was relieved of his duties.

Middle East and Almería
Pedro Emanuel spent the 2018–19 campaign in charge of Al Taawoun FC of the Saudi Professional League, where he came third. The team from Buraidah won the Kings Cup, with a 2–1 win over Al-Ittihad Club (Jeddah) in the final on 2 May 2019.

On 4 August 2019, Pedro Emanuel was appointed at the helm of Spanish Segunda División side UD Almería. Exactly three months later, in spite of being placed second in the standings, he left by mutual agreement.

Pedro Emanuel returned to the Middle East on 5 January 2020 when he was appointed on an 18-month deal at Al Ain FC in the UAE Pro League. Despite qualifying for a President's Cup final before the season was cancelled, he left when his contract expired in May 2021.

At the start of October 2021, Pedro Emanuel went back to the Saudi main division, to take over at third-place Al Nassr FC until the end of the season. After only five matches, however, he left.

On 3 July 2022, Pedro Emanuel signed with newly-promoted Khaleej FC.

Managerial statistics

Honours

Player
Boavista
Primeira Liga: 2000–01
Taça de Portugal: 1996–97

Porto
Primeira Liga: 2002–03, 2003–04, 2005–06, 2007–08, 2008–09
Taça de Portugal: 2002–03, 2005–06, 2008–09
Supertaça Cândido de Oliveira: 2003, 2004
UEFA Cup: 2002–03
UEFA Champions League: 2003–04
Intercontinental Cup: 2004

Manager
Académica
Taça de Portugal: 2011–12
Supertaça Cândido de Oliveira runner-up: 2012

Apollon
Cypriot Cup: 2015–16
Cypriot Super Cup: 2016

Al Taawoun
Kings Cup: 2019

References

External links

1975 births
Living people
Portuguese sportspeople of Angolan descent
Footballers from Luanda
Portuguese footballers
Association football defenders
Primeira Liga players
Liga Portugal 2 players
Segunda Divisão players
F.C. Marco players
A.D. Ovarense players
F.C. Penafiel players
Boavista F.C. players
FC Porto players
UEFA Champions League winning players
UEFA Cup winning players
Portugal under-21 international footballers
Portuguese football managers
Primeira Liga managers
Associação Académica de Coimbra – O.A.F. managers
G.D. Estoril Praia managers
Cypriot First Division managers
Apollon Limassol FC managers
Saudi Professional League managers
Al-Taawoun FC managers
Al Nassr FC managers
Khaleej FC managers
Segunda División managers
UD Almería managers
UAE Pro League managers
Al Ain FC managers
Portuguese expatriate football managers
Expatriate football managers in Cyprus
Expatriate football managers in Saudi Arabia
Expatriate football managers in Spain
Expatriate football managers in the United Arab Emirates
Portuguese expatriate sportspeople in Cyprus
Portuguese expatriate sportspeople in Saudi Arabia
Portuguese expatriate sportspeople in Spain
Portuguese expatriate sportspeople in the United Arab Emirates